Turion may refer to:
 Turion (botany), winter bud in aquatic species
 AMD Turion, family of AMD 64-bit processors